Gerald Joseph McQuaig (January 31, 1912 – February 5, 2001) was an American backup outfielder for the Philadelphia Athletics during the  season.

References

1912 births
2001 deaths
Major League Baseball outfielders
Philadelphia Athletics players
Americus Cardinals players
Columbia Senators players
Elmira Pioneers players
Galveston Buccaneers players
Mercer Bears baseball players
Moultrie Packers players
Williamsport Grays players
Baseball players from Georgia (U.S. state)
People from Buford, Georgia
Sportspeople from the Atlanta metropolitan area